Zurab Makiev (born 30 September 1976, Tbilisi) is a Russian political figure and a deputy of the 6th, 7th, and 8th State Dumas. In 2002, Makiyev was granted a Candidate of Sciences in Sociology degree. 

In 2000, he worked as an executor of bailiff duties at the Ministry of Justice of the Republic of North Ossetia–Alania. From 2004 to 2006, Makiev served as Deputy Director of the Scientific center of legal information at the Ministry of Justice in Moscow. In 2006, he was appointed Deputy Head of the Department of the Ministry of Justice for the Southern Federal District. In 2009, he held the position of First Deputy Director of the Finance Department of the Kostroma Oblast. From 2009 to 2012, Makiev served as Deputy Head of Igor Shuvalov, who at that time was the First Deputy Prime Minister of Russia. In 2014, Makiev was elected deputy of the 6th State Duma. In 2016 and 2021, he became the deputy of the 7th and 8th State Dumas, respectively.

On 24 March 2022, the United States Treasury sanctioned him in response to the 2022 Russian invasion of Ukraine.

References

1976 births
Living people
United Russia politicians
21st-century Russian politicians
Eighth convocation members of the State Duma (Russian Federation)
Seventh convocation members of the State Duma (Russian Federation)
Sixth convocation members of the State Duma (Russian Federation)
Russian individuals subject to the U.S. Department of the Treasury sanctions